is a Japanese judoka.

He started Judo at the age of 12.

He won consecutively the 1985 World Judo Championships and 1987 World Judo Championships.

Sugai later participated in the 1988 Summer Olympics in Seoul, but was defeated by Stéphane Traineau (France) in the first round.

References

External links
 

1962 births
Living people
Japanese male judoka
Olympic judoka of Japan
Judoka at the 1988 Summer Olympics
Judoka at the 1986 Asian Games
Asian Games medalists in judo
Asian Games silver medalists for Japan
Medalists at the 1986 Asian Games
20th-century Japanese people
21st-century Japanese people